Gregory Salata (born July 21, 1949) is an American actor who first came to prominence in the 1975 film Deadly Hero. He is an actor, known for Weekend at Bernie's, The Pink Panther and Rock & Rule.

Filmography

References

External links

1949 births
Living people
American male film actors
American male television actors
Male actors from New York City